Martins Babale (born January 1, 1959) is a Nigerian politician. He is the Deputy governor of Adamawa State. He was elected into office in 2015 alongside Bindo Umaru Jibrilla.

References 

1959 births
Living people
People from Adamawa State
All Progressives Congress politicians